Liam Hinphey (born 15 August 1984) is a dual player of Gaelic games who plays Gaelic football and hurling for the Derry GAA, with whom he has won the National Football League title and Nicky Rackard Cup (hurling).

Hinphey plays his club football for St Canice's GAC Dungiven and club hurling for Kevin Lynch's, with whom he has won five Derry Senior Hurling Championships.

Early and family life
Hinphey is from Dungiven in County Londonderry, Northern Ireland. His father (also Liam) is from hurling stronghold of Kilkenny in the Republic of Ireland, playing for the James Stephens club, one of the most successful hurling clubs of all time and had a big influence on his hurling career. Liam Óg's brother Kevin also plays hurling for Derry. He is a cousin of two-time Derry All Star Joe Brolly.

Football career

Inter-county
Hinphey was first called up to the Derry Senior football panel in November 2005 for the 2006 season. He was part of the Derry team that won the 2008 National League where Derry beat Kerry in the final. Hinphey missed the first round of the 2008 Ulster Senior Football Championship against Donegal with a pelvic injury (osteo pubis), and was expected to be sidelined for the rest of the season. However, early detection and appropriate treatment saw him make a quicker than expected recovery and made his club return in the Derry Championship against Bellaghy on 1 July. He has opted out of the 2009 panel, as he will be traveling around Australia for six months from March 2009 to September 2009.

Club
Hinphey plays his club football for St Canice's Dungiven and won the Derry ACFL Division 2 in 2007. He returned from Australia in late July in time for the latter stages of the 2009 Derry Championship.

School/college
A relative late-comer to football, Hinphey won the MacRory and Hogan Cups in 2003 with St. Pat's Maghera.

Hurling

Inter-county
Hinphey won the Ulster Minor Hurling Championship with Derry minors in 2001. He made his Senior Derry debut when 18 years old against Kerry in 2003. Hinphey has represented Derry, Ulster and even captained Ireland at Under 21 level in hurling. He was part of Derry's 2006 Nicky Rackard Cup winning side. He opted out of the Derry hurling side for the 2008 season to concentrate on football. He returned to the hurling panel in 2009, but was only available for the first two rounds of the National Hurling League, as he decided to travel Australia from March. Having arrived in Sydney he signed for the Sydney Shamrocks Hurling club and played brilliantly at centre back as they won the first NSW competition of the year, the Central Coast tournament.

While travelling in Australia he played for ?.

Club
Hinphey had a highly successful underage career with Kevin Lynchs, for example winning the Ulster Minor Club Hurling Championship with the club in 2002. This success has continued at Senior level. Hinphey has won five Derry hurling Championships with the club (2003, 2004, 2006, 2007 and 2008). He returned from Australia in late July in time for the latter stages of the 2009 Derry Championship.

School/college
Hinphey won the Mageenan Cup on 1/2? occasions with St Pat's.

Province
Hinphey has represented Ulster in the Railway Cup and was captain of the province in 2009.

Honours

Football

Inter-county
National Football League:
Winner (1): 2008
Dr McKenna Cup:
Runner up: 2008

Club
Derry ACFL Division 2:
Winner (1): 2007
Underage competitions

School
MacRory Cup:
Winner (1): 2003
Hogan Cup:
Winner (1): 2003

Hurling

County
Nicky Rackard Cup:
Winner (1): 2006
Ulster Senior Hurling Championship:
Runner up: 2003
Ulster Under-21 Hurling Championship:
Runner up: 2003
Ulster Minor Hurling Championship:
Winner (1): 2001
Runner up: 2002, more?

ClubUlster Senior Club Hurling Championship:Runner up: 2003, 2006, 2007Derry Senior Hurling Championship:Winner (5): 2003, 2004, 2006, 2007, 2008 (Captain.)
Runner up: 2005
Numerous underage awards

SchoolMageean Cup:Winner (1/2?): 2001, 2003?

IndividualUlster Colleges Hurling All-Star:Winner (1?):''' 2003

Note: The above lists may be incomplete. Please add any other honours you know of.

References

External links
Interview with The Irish News (2007)
Player profiles on Official Derry GAA website

1984 births
Living people
Derry inter-county Gaelic footballers
Derry inter-county hurlers
Dual players
Dungiven Gaelic footballers
Kevin Lynch's hurlers
People from Dungiven
Ulster inter-provincial Gaelic footballers